Nickel nitrate is the inorganic compound Ni(NO3)2 or any hydrate thereof.  The anhydrous form is not commonly encountered, thus "nickel nitrate" usually refers to nickel(II) nitrate hexahydrate.  The formula for this species is written in two ways:  Ni(NO3)2.6H2O and, more descriptively [Ni(H2O)6](NO3)2.  The latter formula indicates that the nickel(II) center is surrounded by six water molecules in this hydrated salt.  In the hexahydrate, the nitrate anions are not bonded to nickel. Also known are three other hydrates: Ni(NO3)2.9H2O, Ni(NO3)2.4H2O, and Ni(NO3)2.2H2O.  Anhydrous Ni(NO3)2 is also known.

It is prepared by the reaction of nickel oxide with nitric acid:
 NiO  +  2 HNO3  +  5 H2O    →    Ni(NO3)2.6H2O 
The anhydrous nickel nitrate is typically not prepared by the heating the hydrates.  Rather is generated by reaction of hydrates with dinitrogen pentoxide or of nickel carbonyl with dinitrogen tetroxide:
 Ni(CO)4  +   2 N2O4   →   Ni(NO3)2  +  2 NO  +  4 CO

The hydrated nitrate is often used as a precursor to supported nickel catalysts.

Structure
Nickel(II) compounds with oxygenated ligands often feature octahedral coordination geometry.  Two polymorphs of the tetrahydrate Ni(NO3)2.4H2O have been crystallized.  In one the monodentate nitrate ligands are trans while in the other they are cis.

Safety
Like other nitrates, nickel nitrate is oxidizing. It is also irritating to the eyes, skin and, upon inhalation of the dust, respiratory tract. It may cause skin allergy. Nickel nitrate is a carcinogen, along with most other nickel compounds. The nickel ion is also toxic to aquatic organisms.

Uses

Nickel(II) nitrate is primarily used in electrotyping and electroplating of metallic nickel.

References

Nickel compounds
Nitrates
IARC Group 1 carcinogens
Oxidizing agents